WHPY is a radio station located in Clayton, North Carolina broadcasting on 1590 AM. It broadcasts under the handle of "Fellowship Christian Radio" and airs mainly religious programming from sunrise to sunset. It is run by Fellowship Baptist Church of Clayton and affiliated with the Fundamental Broadcasting Network.

History
WHPY previously aired both top 40 and country music format from the early 1970s to the mid-1990s, before it left the air briefly. Fellowship Baptist purchased the station in 1995, changing it to its current format. During the years when the format was top 40, some of the on-air personalities were Kathy Seadore, Chip Plyler, Mike Edwards, Jim Harrison, Bill Austin and Larry Denning. WHPY used the term "Happy Radio" and provided significant community support through the broadcast of local high school football and basketball games.  The station was initially granted a license by the Federal Communications Commission to operate as a daylight only station, signing on and off daily at FCC stipulated times.  In the early 1970s both the transmitter site and the studio were located in rural Johnson County on the edge a large tobacco field.

External links
WHPY official website

HPY
Johnston County, North Carolina
HPY
Baptist Christianity in North Carolina